Charlie Walker-Blair (born 24 April 1988) is an English rugby union footballer who plays as a flanker. He currently plays for Sale Sharks. He has suffered through his career with an anterior cruciate ligament injury.

Early life 
Born in Kent, he started playing rugby at 15, playing for Taunton and Minehead Barbarians at winger. He went to school at West Somerset Community College, but at the age of 17 went to New Zealand and played for East Coast; in 2008 he returned to play for Carterton.

Club career
He played for Exeter, but he injured himself in his first year, which led to a year out. He returned in 2011 and was dual-registered with Cornish Pirates, but re-ruptured his anterior cruciate ligament and needed another operation, after only playing 12 games. To ease back into rugby he signed for Taunton. On 24 February 2013 he signed for Jersey in the RFU Championship. On 29 April 2013, he signed a deal to join Sale Sharks in the Aviva Premiership.

References

1988 births
Living people
Cornish Pirates players
English rugby union players
Exeter Chiefs players
Jersey Reds players
Rugby union players from Kent
Sale Sharks players
Rugby union flankers